Antonaria is a genus of beetles in the family Megalopodidae, containing the following species:

 Antonaria albonotata Pic, 1912
 Antonaria burgeoni Pic, 1951
 Antonaria dentata Erber & Medvedev, 2002
 Antonaria favareli Pic, 1946
 Antonaria femorata Clavareau, 1905
 Antonaria fulvicornis (Jacoby, 1901)
 Antonaria ghesquierei Pic, 1951
 Antonaria hirsuta (Jacoby, 1898)
 Antonaria humeralis Weise, 1912
 Antonaria leroyi Pic, 1951
 Antonaria modesta (Jacoby, 1894)
 Antonaria murina (Westwood, 1864)
 Antonaria pallidipennis Pic, 1951
 Antonaria quadrinotata Pic, 1951
 Antonaria suturella Weise, 1915
 Antonaria testaceipes Pic, 1930
 Antonaria tibialis Erber & Medvedev, 2002
 Antonaria varicolor (Jacoby, 1894)

References

Megalopodidae genera
Taxa named by Martin Jacoby